Jenner School or Jenner Elementary School may refer to:
 Edward Jenner School (later Jenner Academy of the Arts) in Chicago
 Jenner School, Prairie Rose School Division 8, Jenner, Alberta